João Luiz Woerdenbag Filho (born October 11, 1957), popularly known as Lobão ("Big Wolf", in reference to the Disney depiction of the Big Bad Wolf character), is a Brazilian singer-songwriter, composer, multi-instrumentalist, writer, publisher, television host and media personality. He is perhaps best known for his hit songs "Me Chama" ("Call Me") and "Vida Louca Vida" ("Life, Crazy Life") as well as seminal works Vida Bandida and A Vida É Doce.

Aside from his musical works, Lobão acquired a reputation for having little inhibition in expressing his opinions, as well as bluntly and publicly criticising fellow musicians, which led to a notable number of controversies and enmities. His most recent controversy was a break-up with the record industry; claiming that all major labels are conspiring to deceive their own artists (by underreporting sales and using piracy as a scapegoat), he set an independent distribution plan to sell music CDs on newsstands and through the internet. Thus far, this endeavor has been very successful: his recent albums sold well and were critically acclaimed

Lobão also created a magazine, Outracoisa (literally somethingelse or anotherthing), which comes bundled with a music CD of independent artists.

Life and career
Born João Luiz Woerdenbag Filho on October 11, 1957, in Rio de Janeiro to João Luiz Woerdenbag, an auto mechanic working for Rede Globo, and Ruth Araújo de Mattos, an English teacher. Lobão is of distant Dutch descent. His career had beginnings at 17 years old, when he left his home to become a professional musician, first participating in a theater play featuring Marília Pêra then joining progressive rock band Vímana as a drummer in 1975, with yet-to-be-known figures such as Lulu Santos and Ritchie. Vímana would dissolve three years later, having a fruitless try as Patrick Moraz's backing band. Lobão, still as a drummer, resumed his career playing with Luiz Melodia, Walter Franco and Marina Lima before forming new wave-inspired band Blitz in 1980. Blitz would be disappointing for him, who left the band for alleged ideological reasons before its eventual commercial success. The early 1980s also saw Lobão joining for a brief time Júlio Barroso's innovative ensemble Gang 90 & As Absurdettes.

Since 2013, Lobão also has recorded hangouts with Olavo de Carvalho other Brazilian conservative personalities.

Discography
 Cena de Cinema (1982)
 Ronaldo foi pra Guerra (1984)
 O Rock Errou (1986)
 Vida Bandida (1987)
 Cuidado! (1988)
 Sob o Sol de Parador (1989)
 Vivo (1990)
 O Inferno é Fogo (1991)
 Nostalgia da Modernidade (1995)
 Noite (1998)
 A Vida é Doce (1999)
 2001: Uma Odisséia no Universo Paralelo (2001)
 Canções Dentro da Noite Escura (2005)
 Acústico MTV (2007)
 Lobão Elétrico: Lino, Sexy & Brutal (Ao Vivo Em São Paulo) (2012)

References

External links
Official website in Portuguese
Outracoisa magazine in Portuguese

1957 births
Living people
Brazilian drummers
Brazilian guitarists
Brazilian male guitarists
Brazilian rock musicians
Brazilian people of Dutch descent
Latin Grammy Award winners
Conservatism in Brazil
Virgin Records artists
Música Popular Brasileira guitarists
Música Popular Brasileira singers
Musicians from Rio de Janeiro (city)
Brazilian rock singers